Cunitz is a crater on Venus at latitude 14.5, longitude 350.9 in western Eistla Regio. It is 48.6 km in diameter and was named for a 17th-century Silesian astronomer Maria Cunitz.

References

Impact craters on Venus